Guadalupe Natalia Tovar Sullivan (27 July 1910 – 12 November 2016), known professionally as Lupita Tovar, was a Mexican-born American actress best known for her starring role in the 1931 Spanish-language version of Drácula, filmed in Los Angeles by Universal Pictures at night using the same sets as the Bela Lugosi version, but with a different cast and director. She also starred in the 1932 film Santa, one of the first Mexican sound films, and one of the first commercial Spanish-language sound films.

Early life 
Tovar was born in Matías Romero, Oaxaca, Mexico, the daughter of Egidio Tovar, who was from Tehuacán, Puebla, Mexico, and Mary Tovar (née Sullivan), who was Irish-Mexican, from Matías Romero, Oaxaca, Mexico. Tovar was the oldest of nine children, though many of her siblings did not survive early childhood. Tovar grew up during the time of the Mexican Revolution and her family was very poor. She was raised in a very religious Catholic environment, and went to a school where she was taught by nuns.

In 1918, Tovar's family moved north to Mexico City where her father worked for the National Railroad of Mexico in an administrative position.

Career

Early career 

Tovar was discovered by documentary filmmaker Robert Flaherty in Mexico City. Tovar had performed in a dance class and was invited, along with other girls, to do a screen test as part of a competition. Tovar won first place. The prize was a 6-month probation period, followed by a 7-year contract at $150/week, to Fox Studios. The studio had realized they could make money by simultaneously shooting Spanish-language movies of English language studio productions, so had been casting for Spanish stars. She moved to Hollywood in November 1928 with her maternal grandmother, Lucy Sullivan.

Tovar, under contract, was required to study intensively to enhance her skills for films. Her weekly schedule included guitar, two hours four days; Spanish dances, one hour three days; dramatics, one-half hour two days; and English, one hour every day. Her accent was considered an asset in talking motion pictures. Her English improved significantly in just seven months from the time she arrived in Hollywood in January 1929, when she could not say "good morning" in English. To improve her English, she attended talkies; she also learned new words and how to say them by reading voraciously. In 1929, Tovar appeared in the films The Veiled Woman with Bela Lugosi (now thought to be a lost film) and The Cock-Eyed World.

In 1930, she was mentioned for leads in two talkies starring Douglas Fairbanks Sr. and Richard Barthelmess. Fairbanks put off the filming of what became The Exile. After his death, the film was made in 1947 by his son, Douglas, Jr., directed by Max Ophüls.

Spanish language remakes 
Lupita's future husband, producer Paul Kohner, convinced Carl Laemmle to make Spanish language movies that could be shot simultaneously at night with their English originals. When sound films began to dominate the industry, casting director Jimmy Ryan warned her that her poor English would not work and her option would not be picked up. However, he recommended pursuing work in the foreign film department. She went to the office and sat around all day without being seen; she left early because a man kept staring at her and made her feel uncomfortable. When she returned to the office another day she met the head of the department, Kohner, who was the man who kept staring at her before. He offered her a job making $15 a day to dubbing films in Spanish, her first being The King of Jazz.

In 1930, Tovar starred opposite Antonio Moreno in La Voluntad del Muerto, the Spanish-language version of The Cat Creeps and was based on the John Willard mystery play, The Cat and the Canary. Both The Cat Creeps and La Voluntad del muerto were remakes of The Cat and the Canary (1927). Casting was done in July 1930 with the film being released later the same year. The Spanish version was directed by George Melford and, like the Spanish-language version of Dracula (1931), was filmed at night using the same sets as those used for filming the English-language version during the day.

Tovar shot Drácula, in 1930, when she was 20 years old. The film was produced by her soon-to-be husband, Paul Kohner.

Santa 

In 1932, Tovar starred in the film Santa, the first to have synchronized sound and image on the same celluloid strip.

The film was based on a famous book featuring an innocent girl from the country who has an affair with a soldier and then tragically becomes a prostitute. Santa was such a hit that the Mexican government issued a postage stamp featuring Tovar as Santa. "I tell you I could not walk on the streets when Santa came out," Tovar said. "People tore my dress for souvenirs. It was something."

In 2006, Santa was shown in a celebratory screening by the Academy of Motion Picture Arts and Sciences called "A Salute to Lupita Tovar" that featured a conversation between Tovar and film historian Bob Dickson. The event was in honor of Tovar.

Other films 
In 1931, Melford directed Tovar in another Universal picture, East of Borneo, which starred Rose Hobart. Tovar also worked on films at Columbia Pictures. Although she herself did not make any silent films, with her earliest films released by Fox Film Corporation in the Fox Movietone sound-on-film system, some may have been released in silent versions for theaters not yet equipped for sound.

Personal life 

Tovar went by the nickname Lupita from the time she was a child.

During the filming of Santa in Mexico, producer Paul Kohner had to return to Europe because his father was sick. It was this separation, and another the next year when Kohner was producing a film for Universal in Europe, that made Tovar realize she loved Kohner. Kohner proposed on the phone—he had previously tried to give her a ring—and Tovar went to Czechoslovakia to meet him. They were married,  by a rabbi, in Czechoslovakia on October 30, 1932, at Kohner's parents' home.

In 1936, the couple had a daughter, Susan Kohner, later a film and television actress, and, in 1939, a son, Paul Julius "Pancho" Kohner Jr., a director and producer. Their grandsons, Chris and Paul Weitz, are successful film directors.

Tovar owned a bassinet that would be used by several well known New Yorkers, including Julie Baumgold, a writer and her husband Edward Kosner, publisher of New York; Elizabeth Sobieski, a novelist and mother of actress Leelee Sobieski, Judy Licht, a TV newswoman, and her husband Jerry Della Femina, an advertising executive.

The release of the Spanish-language Drácula on home video in the early 1990s caused a revival of Tovar's films. "It's like a dream being invited to all of these festivals and showings of my films. Was that really me up there on the screen? I had almost forgotten I was an actress. It has been absolutely wonderful how people have been so nice. Usually people die and then they get the award, but to be alive and receive this honor is fantastic!"

Death 
Tovar died at the age of 106 on 12 November 2016 in Los Angeles of heart disease, just one day after her daughter Susan Kohner's 80th birthday.

Awards 
 2001: Academia Mexicana de Artes y Ciencias Cinematográficas (Mexican Academy of Arts and Sciences), Lifetime Achievement Award at the XLIII Ceremonia de Entrega del Arielrecibió el Ariel de Oro

Filmography 

1929: The Veiled Woman (Fox) as Young girl
1929: Joy Street (Fox)
1929: The Cock-Eyed World (Fox) as Minor Role (uncredited)
1929: The Black Watch (Fox) as Minor Role (uncredited)
1930: King of Jazz as Emcee's Assistant - Spanish Version
1930: La Voluntad del Muerto (Universal) (Spanish-language version of The Cat Creeps) as Anita
1931: Estamos en París (Short)
1931: Drácula (Universal) (Spanish-language version of Dracula) as Eva
1931: Carne de Cabaret (Columbia) (Spanish version of Ten Cents a Dance) as Dorothy O'Neil
1931: Yankee Don (Richard Talmadge Productions) as Juanita
1931: El Tenorio del Harem (Universal) as Fátima
1931: East of Borneo (Universal) as Neila
1931: Border Law (Columbia) as Tonita
1932: Santa (Compañia Nacional Productora de Peliculas) as Santa
1934: Vidas Rotas (Inca) (Spanish)
1935: Broken Lives as Marcela
1935: Alas Sobre del Chaco (Universal) (Spanish-language version of Storm Over the Andes) as Teresa
1936: The Invader aka An Old Spanish Custom (British & Continental Films) as Lupita Melez
1936: Mariguana (Mexican) as Irene Heredia
1936: El Capitán Tormenta (Grand National) (Spanish-language version of Captain Calamity) as Magda
1938: Blockade (United Artists) as Cabaret Girl
1938: El Rosario de Amozoc (Mexican) as Rosario
1938: María (Mexican) as María
1939: The Fighting Gringo (RKO) as Anita "Nita" del Campo
1939: Tropic Fury (Universal) as Maria Scipio
1939: South of the Border (Republic) as Dolores Mendoza
1940: Green Hell (Universal) as Native Girl
1940: The Westerner (United Artists) as Teresita (uncredited)
1941: Two Gun Sheriff (Republic) as Nita
1943: Resurrección (Mexican) as María
1944: Gun to Gun (Warner Bros.) (Short) as Dolores Diego
1944: Miguel Strogoff (El Correo del Zar) (Mexican) as Nadia Fedorova
1945: The Crime Doctor's Courage (Columbia) as Dolores Bragga
1952: Invitation Playhouse: Mind Over Murder (TV Series, Episode: "Winner Take Nothing") (final appearance)
1998: Universal Horror (TV Movie documentary) as Interviewee

See also 
 Cinema of Mexico

References

Further reading

Articles 
 Babcock, Muriel. "Wave of Popularity Sweeping Mexican Stars to Top Goes Marching On: Directors Tell How Latin-American Beauties Have Carved Niche for Themselves in Filmdom's Hall of Fame." Los Angeles Times. January 27, 1929. p. C11 (1 page).
 Olean Herald, "Hollywood Sights and Sounds." Saturday Evening. July 20, 1929. p. 4.
 Boland, Elena. "Aliens Retain Screen Niche: Sound Films Disclose Need of Many Accents Separate Pictures Made For Different Countries Certainty of Future Held as Settled Fact." Los Angeles Times. February 2, 1930, p. B11 (2 pages).
 Kingsley, Grace. "Browning Picks Story and Star: Fairbanks Will Play Bandit in Tale of Spanish Days; Richard Keene Loaned to First National; Paul Page Has "Man Crazy" Role." Los Angeles Times. March 12, 1930, p. A8 (1 page).
 Kingsley, Grace. "Duncan Sisters May Go Abroad: Joseph Santley Writes Story for Helen Twelvetrees Toreador Signs With First National for Film Norman Taurog Will Direct Ed Wynn Comedy." Los Angeles Times. July 23, 1930. p. 6 (1 page).
 Kingsley, Grace. "Lupita Tovar Goes Abroad: Actress Will Meet Fiance, Paul Kohner, in Paris Capt. Mollison Decides Not to Become Actor Helen Mack Wins Lead With Ken Maynard." Los Angeles Times. August 27, 1932. p. 5 (1 page).
 Kingsley, Grace. "Lupita Tovar, Kohner Marry: Producer and Actress Wed in Czechlo-Slovakia Gloria Stuart Takes Novel Trip as Air Mail Howard Hughes Searches for Beauty in New York." Los Angeles Times. November 2, 1932. p. 11 (1 page).
 Weaver, Tom. "Bitten in Spanish," "Fangoria" #119. December 1992.

Archival material 
 Kohner Family Papers, ~1970-2008. Riverside, CA: University of California, Riverside.

Monographs 
 Ankerich, Michael G. The Sound of Silence: Conversations with 16 Film and Stage Personalities Who Bridged the Gap between Silents and Talkies. Reprinted. ed. Jefferson, N.C.: McFarland & Co., 2011. Chapter 15, pp. 218–233. . 
 Tovar, Lupita, and Pancho Kohner. Lupita Tovar: The Sweetheart of Mexico: A Memoir As Told to Her Son Pancho Kohner. Bloomington, IN: Xlibris Corp, 2011.  
 Kohner, Pancho. Lupita Tovar: La novia de México: Memorias, Tal y Como Fueron Relatadas a su Hijo. Create Space Independent Publishing Platform, 2012.

External links 

 
 Lupita Tovar in Cine Mexicano (ITESM)
 Kohner Family Papers, ~1970-2008 at University of California, Riverside

1910 births
2016 deaths
American centenarians
American film actresses
Golden Age of Mexican cinema
Golden Ariel Award winners
Mexican film actresses
Mexican emigrants to the United States
Actresses from Oaxaca
20th-century Mexican actresses
20th-century American actresses
Burials at Hillside Memorial Park Cemetery
Mexican centenarians
Women centenarians
Kohner family
21st-century American women